The Man from Hell's Edges (also known as El Lobo) is a 1932 American Pre-Code Western film starring Bob Steele, written and direct by Steele's father, Robert N. Bradbury, for Trem Carr Pictures. It was released in the United States on June 15, 1932.

Plot
Seeking to avenge his father, Bob Williams, also known as "Flash" Manning, (Bob Steele) breaks out of prison, goes to the town where his father was killed, takes a job as town deputy, then ingratiates himself to the local outlaws, one of whom he believes to be his father's killer.

Cast
 Bob Steele as Bob Williams
 Julian Rivero as Lobo
 Nancy Drexel as Betty
 Robert Homans as Sheriff
 George Hayes as Shamrock Cassidy
 Gilbert Holmes as Half Pint
 Perry Murdock as Joe Danti

External links
 

1932 films
American black-and-white films
American Western (genre) films
Films directed by Robert N. Bradbury
1932 Western (genre) films
1930s American films